The Imcheon Seowon is a seowon located in the neighborhood of Songhyeon-dong of Andong, North Gyeongsang Province, South Korea. Seowon is a type of local academy during the Joseon Dynasty (1392–1897). It was first established  by local Confucian scholars in 1607, the 40th year of King Seonjo's reign, to commemorate the scholarly achievement and virtue of the Confucian scholar and politician Kim Seong-il (金誠一 1538-1593).

See also
Dosan Seowon
Byeongsan Seowon
Korean Confucianism

References

External links

 만물상 서애와 학봉 at The Chosun Ilbo

Seowon
Andong
1607 establishments in Asia
Buildings and structures in North Gyeongsang Province
17th-century establishments in Korea